The Mrežnica is a river in Karlovac County, Croatia.

Mrežnica is considered special due to its large number of waterfalls, totalling 93. It rises in Kordun, west of Slunj, and flows northwards, in parallel to Dobra and Korana, through Generalski Stol and Duga Resa, when it finally flows into the Korana in the south of Karlovac (at Mostanje/Turanj).

The Gojak Hydroelectric Power Plant is a high pressure diversion plant which harnesses the river power of the Ogulinska Dobra and Mrežnica rivers.

References

External links

Rivers of Croatia
Landforms of Karlovac County